South Korea competed at the 1976 Summer Paralympics in Toronto, Ontario, Canada.

Medalists

Archery

Athletics

Dartchery

Table tennis

 Men's Singles 1C — Kim Young-Tae (7th)
 Men's Singles 2 — Choi Tae-Am
 Men's Singles 2 — Ko Gun-Hong (36th)
 Men's Singles 3 — Son Kum-Du
 Men's Singles 4-5 — Kim So-Boo (7th)
 Men's Teams 2 — Choi Tae-Am, Kim Young-Tae, Ko Gun-Hong
 Men's Teams 4-5 — Kim So-Boo, Son Kum-Du (7th)

References

 IPC

Nations at the 1976 Summer Paralympics
1976
Paralympics